Psamatodes everiata is a species of geometrid moth in the family Geometridae. It is found in the Caribbean Sea, Central America, North America, and South America.

The MONA or Hodges number for Psamatodes everiata is 6333.

Subspecies
These two subspecies belong to the species Psamatodes everiata:
 Psamatodes everiata errata (McDunnough, 1939)
 Psamatodes everiata everiata (Guenée in Boisduval & Guenée, 1858)

References

Further reading

 

Macariini
Articles created by Qbugbot
Moths described in 1858